Morton Bahr (July 18, 1926 – July 30, 2019) was an American labor union leader. He served as the president of the Communications Workers of America from 1985 to 2005, and as the president of the Jewish Labor Committee from 1999 to 2001. He served on the AFL–CIO executive council.

Bahr was born in Brooklyn, N.Y. and enrolled in Brooklyn College at age 16, playing varsity baseball.  He left before he graduated to enlist in the Merchant Marines during WWII.

References

External links

1926 births
2019 deaths
Communications Workers of America people
Deaths from pancreatic cancer
People from Brooklyn
Brooklyn College alumni
American trade union leaders
Trade unionists from New York (state)
Jewish American trade unionists
21st-century American Jews